Tiffany Million (born Sandra Lee Schwab on April 6, 1966), also known as Tyffany Million, is a former professional wrestler and American pornographic performer who appeared in both heterosexual and lesbian videos. She retired from the adult industry in 1994.

As Sandra Scott, she was the subject of the 2007 reality show Wife, Mom, Bounty Hunter, which aired on WE: Women's Entertainment for one season. She also appeared as herself in the 2012 documentary film After Porn Ends.

Career

Professional wrestling
In the late 1980s she became a member of the Gorgeous Ladies of Wrestling (G.L.O.W.) organization and adopted the wrestling name of "Tiffany Mellon". She and Roxy Astor were a tag team known as the "Park Avenue Knockouts". She left G.L.O.W. in 1989, claiming that G.L.O.W.'s management harassed her and a fellow wrestler because they were suspected of being lesbians.

Mainstream film and television
Million appeared in several mainstream films and television series such as Caged Fury, The Sleeping Car and Tales from the Crypt.

Adult films
In 1992 she entered the porn industry, making her first appearance in the video Twister. By 1994 she had appeared in about 100 X-rated films. She also started a production company, Immaculate Video Conceptions, and directed several movies that had a playful, feminist point of view. In 1994, she was one of the first adult film stars profiled in her own issue of the Carnal Comics line of autobiographical comic books. She does acknowledge that she was involved with women in her personal life and, for a time in the mid-'90s, she had a relationship with porn actress and fellow Carnal Comics star Jill Kelly.

For 20 years, Million worked as a stripper.

Later career
After getting an inheritance, she quit the adult business.

According to her website, she is now a happily married mother of two children. She is a self-described libertarian and individualist feminist.

Today, she goes by the name Sandra Margot-Escott or Sandra Scott and is a bounty hunter and private investigator for Skye-Lane Investigations. According to her website, she refuses to answer questions about her former career.

She is featured on the reality TV show, Wife, Mom, Bounty Hunter, which premiered on the WE Channel on April 20, 2007. In 2010, she appeared in the documentary After Porn Ends.

She now is launching a career as radio political talk show host under the name Margot Monday.

Awards
 1994 AVN Award - Best Group Scene, Film (New Wave Hookers 3)
 1994 XRCO Award - Best Actress, Single Performance (Sex)
 1995 AVN Award - Best Supporting Actress—Film (Sex)

References

External links
 Homepage (archived)
 
 
 

1966 births
American female professional wrestlers
American feminists
American libertarians
American pornographic film actresses
Bounty hunters
Individualist feminists
Sex-positive feminists
Living people
Participants in American reality television series
Sportspeople from Richmond, California
Pornographic film actors from California
Professional wrestlers from California
21st-century American women